Queen Charlotte City Water Aerodrome  is located adjacent to Queen Charlotte City, British Columbia, Canada.

References

Seaplane bases in British Columbia
North Coast Regional District
Graham Island
Registered aerodromes in British Columbia